
Gmina Konopiska is a rural gmina (administrative district) in Częstochowa County, Silesian Voivodeship, in southern Poland.

The gmina contains part of the protected area called Upper Liswarta Forests Landscape Park.

Villages
Gmina Konopiska contains the villages and settlements of Aleksandria, Aleksandria Druga, Hutki, Jamki, Konopiska, Kopalnia, Korzonek, Kowale, Łaziec, Leśniaki, Rększowice, Walaszczyki, Wąsosz and Wygoda.

Neighbouring gminas
Gmina Konopiska is bordered by the city of Częstochowa and by the gminas of Blachownia, Boronów, Herby, Poczesna, Starcza and Woźniki.

Twin towns – sister cities

Gmina Konopiska is twinned with:
 Dzhuriv, Ukraine
 Handlová, Slovakia
 Hanstein-Rusteberg, Germany

References

Konopiska
Częstochowa County